John Louis Bragg,  (born May 3, 1940) is a Canadian businessman and former Chancellor of Mount Allison University.

Early life and education
The Bragg family has called Nova Scotia home for 180 years. John was born in Collingwood, Nova Scotia, he received a Bachelor of Commerce degree and a Bachelor of Education degree from Mount Allison University.

Career

He is the Chairman, President and Co-Chief Executive Officer of Oxford Frozen Foods Limited, a food manufacturer which he founded in 1968 and operates the largest fruit farm in the world, with over 12,000 acres (49 km2) of wild blueberries.  He also founded a cable television company in the 1970s which became known as Bragg Communications and was subsequently expanded to become EastLink.

Bragg built his first blueberry-processing factory in 1968, and the business is still experiencing double-digit growth today. In 2015, Bragg opened a new facility in Saint-Isidore, New Brunswick, that is considered to  "the most modern blueberry processing facility in the world." It can process up to 1.5 million pounds of blueberries per day.

Bragg had a net worth of $1.11 billion CDN in 2015.

He was ranked No. 86 in Canadian Business's list of Canada's richest people in 2017.

Business involvement 

He is or was a director of TD Bank Financial Group, Canada Bread Limited, Empire Company Limited and Sobeys Inc.

Recognition 

In 1996, he was made an Officer of the Order of Canada and promoted to Companion in 2022. In 1994, he was awarded the National Entrepreneur of the Year Award by the Governor General of Canada Ray Hnatyshyn. He was named to the Order of Nova Scotia in 2018.

Bragg and his business empire were the subject of a lengthy interview/profile in The Globe and Mail, which observed that "Beneath the veneer of the rural blueberry baron, there is one tough, risk-taking tycoon with an ardour for growth, game-changing technology, and debt financing."

He was promoted to Companion of the Order of Canada in 2022.

Personal life 
He and wife Judy have four children: Lee, Matthew, Carolyn and Patricia, all of whom have worked or now work in the business.

He lives in Oxford, Nova Scotia.

References

1940 births
Living people
Canadian university and college chancellors
Canadian people of English descent
Mount Allison University alumni
Companions of the Order of Canada
People from Cumberland County, Nova Scotia
Directors of Toronto-Dominion Bank
Agriculture in Nova Scotia
Members of the Order of Nova Scotia